Atherigona miliaceae, the finger millet shoot fly, is a species of fly in the family Muscidae. The larvae feed on the central growing shoots of crops such as finger millet, little millet, and proso millet. It is found in East Asia and South Asia.

References

Muscidae
Insect pests of millets
Taxa named by John Russell Malloch